Arizona State Prison Complex – Florence also known as Florence State Prison (FSP) is one of 13 prison facilities operated by the Arizona Department of Corrections (ADC). The main FSP prison is located in Florence, Arizona. The Florence complex used to include a unit in Picacho in unincorporated Pinal County however, the Picacho Unit was closed and destroyed in early 2013. The Globe Unit in Globe is also a part of Florence Complex.

The Central Unit of ASPC–Florence houses Arizona's death row.

In 1908 inmates finished building and opened the Arizona Prison at Florence. This new prison was to replace the territorial prison in Yuma. The convicts lived in tents while constructing the prison. The new prison featured a death chamber. The chamber was scaffolding above the death row cells that had a trap door for hanging inmates which opened to a room below. In 1934, hanging was replaced with the gas chamber following a botched hanging that took place in 1930. Convicts from Florence were a cheap source of labor and the state used them to build roads through the mountains between Bisbee and Tombstone in 1913. Convicts also built a bridge over the San Pedro River and improved the Douglas Highway. There is a concrete monument there commemorating the completion of the road.

The prison was designed in a mission-revival style architecture.

FSP has an inmate capacity of 3,946 in 6 housing units, housed at level 2, 3 and 5 security levels. The ADC uses a score classification system to assess inmates appropriate custody and security level placement. The scores range from 1 to 5 with 5 being the highest risk or need. FSP is the judicial site in Arizona for state executions since 1910. The death house is located beside Housing Unit 8. Lethal injection and the gas chamber are the sole methods of execution.

Central Unit was recently changed from a split 3/5 level to a sole maximum security unit.

See also 

 Thomas H. Rynning
 List of U.S. state prisons
 List of Arizona state prisons

References

External links 
 Arizona State Prison Complex – Florence – Arizona Department of Corrections

Florence
Buildings and structures in Pinal County, Arizona
Capital punishment in Arizona
Execution sites in the United States
Florence, Arizona
1908 establishments in Arizona Territory